Matthew Brian Winkler (November 21, 1974 – March 22, 2006) was a minister who was the victim in a high-profile murder case in 2006.

Early life
Winkler was raised in Woodbury, Tennessee; Huntingdon, Tennessee; and  Decatur, Alabama. He attended college at Freed-Hardeman University in Henderson, Tennessee in 1990s and moved to Selmer, Tennessee after he got married. He had three daughters named Patricia, then 8; Mary Alice, then 6; Brianna, then 1, whose custody was given to their mother later.

Death
Winkler was serving as the pulpit minister at the Fourth Street Church of Christ in Selmer, Tennessee, at the time of his death. Members of his congregation found him dead inside his home after he failed to appear at the church for a Wednesday-night service he was to lead on March 22, 2006. He had been shot in the back.

Confession of Mary Winkler
Mary Winkler, his wife; and the couple's three small daughters were reported missing along with the family's minivan. The state of Tennessee issued an Amber Alert, and Mary and the children were located the next day in Orange Beach, Alabama. Mary would confess to killing her husband and be charged with first-degree murder after extradition to Tennessee. She was released on bond, and her trial began on April 9, 2007.

At trial, Mary claimed that she had suffered extensive physical and emotional abuse at her husband's hands. She was convicted of voluntary manslaughter and sentenced to 150 days in prison plus 60 days in a mental health facility.

See also
 Mary Winkler

References 

1974 births
2006 deaths
2006 murders in the United States
Ministers of the Churches of Christ
Freed–Hardeman University alumni
American murder victims
American members of the Churches of Christ
Mariticides
Deaths by firearm in Tennessee
People from Woodbury, Tennessee
People from Huntingdon, Tennessee
People from Decatur, Alabama
People from Humboldt County, Nevada
People murdered in Tennessee
People from McNairy County, Tennessee